The Volgograd Reservoir is a reservoir in Russia formed at the Volga River by the dam of the Volga Hydroelectric Station. It lies within the Volgograd Oblast and Saratov Oblast and named after the city of Volgograd. It was constructed during 1958–1961.

Its area is 3,117 km2, volume is 31,5 km³, length is 540 km, maximal width is 17 km, average depth is  10.1 m. It is the third largest reservoir on Volga in Russia (after Kuybyshev Reservoir and Rybinsk Reservoir).

References 

Reservoirs in Russia
Reservoirs in Saratov Oblast
Reservoirs in Volgograd Oblast
RVolgograd
Reservoirs built in the Soviet Union